Pferdskopf is a mountain of Hesse, Germany, in the vicinity of the Wasserkuppe in the Rhön Mountains.
	

Mountains of Hesse
Mountains and hills of the Rhön